Edward Benjamin Scheve (1865–1924) was an American composer; born in Germany, he came to the United States in 1888, initially settling in Rochester, New York.  In 1906, he moved to Grinnell, Iowa and became a professor at Grinnell College, where he taught music. He wrote a number of orchestral works, including a symphony and two concertos; he also composed for choir, and wrote oratorios and anthems.  His output also includes some songs and works for piano. Scheve died in Longmont, Colorado in 1924.

Notes

References

External links
 

1865 births
1924 deaths
American male composers
American composers
German emigrants to the United States